Judge Parker is a syndicated comic strip.

Judge Parker may also refer to:

Alton B. Parker (1852–1926), New York Court of Appeals (1898–1904)
Barrington D. Parker (1915–1993), judge of the United States District Court for the District of Columbia
Barrington D. Parker Jr. (born 1944), judge of the United States Court of Appeals for the Second Circuit
Edna G. Parker (1930–1996), judge of the United States Tax Court
Fred I. Parker (1938–2003), judge of the United States Court of Appeals for the Second Circuit
Isaac Charles Parker (1838–1896), United States District Court for the Western District of Arkansas (1875–96)
James Aubrey Parker (1937–2022), judge of the United States District Court for the District of New Mexico
John J. Parker (1885–1958), United States Court of Appeals for the Fourth Circuit (1925–58)
John Victor Parker (1928–2014), judge of the United States District Court for the Middle District of Louisiana
Linda Vivienne Parker (born 1958), United States District Court for the Eastern District of Michigan (2014-present)
Robert Manley Parker (1937–2020), judge of the United States Court of Appeals for the Fifth Circuit
Tommy Parker (judge) (born 1963), judge of the United States District Court for the Western District of Tennessee

See also
Justice Parker (disambiguation)